This article lists results for French association football team AS Cannes in European competition.

Participations
As of 4 December 2012, Cannes have competed in:
2 participations in the UEFA Cup / UEFA Europa League

Record by competition
As of 4 December 2012

Matches in Europe

References

 UEFA European Cup Matches - AS Cannes

Europe
Cannes